The women's banked slalom competition of the 2018 Winter Paralympics was held at Jeongseon Alpine Centre, South Korea. The competition took place on 16 March 2018.

Medal table

Banked slalom SB-LL1

The following 5 athletes qualified for the competition.

Banked slalom SB-LL2

The following 8 athletes qualified for the competition.

See also
Snowboarding at the 2018 Winter Olympics

References

External links

Women's banked slalom